The Second Colijn cabinet was the cabinet of the Netherlands from 26 May 1933 until 31 July 1935. The cabinet was formed by the political parties Roman Catholic State Party (RKSP), Anti-Revolutionary Party (ARP), Christian Historical Union (CHU), Liberal State Party (LSP) and the Free-thinking Democratic League (VDB) after the election of 1933. The centre-right cabinet was a majority government in the House of Representatives. It was the second of five cabinets of Hendrikus Colijn, the Leader of the Anti-Revolutionary Party as Prime Minister.

Cabinet Members

 Retained this position from the previous cabinet.
 Resigned.
 Served ad interim.
 Died in office.

References

External links
Official

  Kabinet-Colijn II Parlement & Politiek

Cabinets of the Netherlands
1933 establishments in the Netherlands
1935 disestablishments in the Netherlands
Cabinets established in 1933
Cabinets disestablished in 1935